Ike Joseph Udanoh (born August 2, 1989) is an American-Nigerian professional basketball player for SIG Strasbourg of the French LNB Pro A. He is a  power forward.

Professional career
On June 11, 2018, Udanoh signed a deal with Italian club Pallacanestro Cantù. On August 23, 2018, he was named team captain.

On February 24, 2019 he has signed with Sidigas Avellino of the Italian Lega Basket Serie A (LBA).

On July 7, 2019, he has signed with Reyer Venezia of the Italian Lega Basket Serie A (LBA).

On June 23, 2020, he continued to play in Italy and signed with Pallacanestro Trieste.

On January 7, 2020, he transfers to the LNB Pro A in France, signing with SIG Strasbourg.

References

External links
LBA profile  Retrieved 24 August 2018
Sports-reference.com (NCAA) profile  Retrieved 24 August 2018
VTB League profile  Retrieved 24 August 2018

1989 births
Living people
American men's basketball players
American expatriate basketball people in Austria
American expatriate basketball people in Finland
American expatriate basketball people in France
American expatriate basketball people in Italy
American expatriate basketball people in Kazakhstan
American expatriate basketball people in Qatar
Basketball players from Michigan
BC Astana players
Bisons Loimaa players
Flyers Wels players
HTV Basket players
Lega Basket Serie A players
LIU Brooklyn Blackbirds men's basketball players
Pallacanestro Cantù players
Pallacanestro Mantovana players
Power forwards (basketball)
S.S. Felice Scandone players
SIG Basket players
Wayne State Warriors men's basketball players